Shetty is a surname originating from  coastal Karnataka state of India. Found amongst the Bunt (community).

Notable people
Notable people with the surname Shetty, include:

 A. B. Shetty (1883–1960), politician and philanthropist
 Ajit Shetty (born 1946), Indian-Belgian entrepreneur
 Anushka Shetty (born 1981), actress
 B. R. Shetty (born 1942), entrepreneur
 B. Vithal Shetty, American scientist
 Balkrishna Shetty (born 1950), diplomat
 Bharath Shetty Y (born 1971), Indian politician

 Dayanand Shetty (born 1969), actor, model and entrepreneur
 Deepak Shetty (born 1991), Indian cricketer
 Devi Shetty, philanthropist and cardiac surgeon
 Gurukiran Shetty, music director
 Jay Shetty, motivational speaker
 K. K. Shetty (1901–?), journalist
 K Madhukar Shetty (1971-2018), IPS officer
 Kalmanje Jagannatha Shetty (1926–2015), former judge, Supreme Court of India
 Krithi Shetty (born - 2003), Indian actress
 M. B. Shetty (1938–1982), Indian choreographer and actor
 Manmohan Shetty, entrepreneur
 Manohar Shetty, Goa based poet
 Neha Shetty, Indian actress 
 Prakash Shetty (born 1960), cartoonist
 R. N. Shetty (born 1928), Indian entrepreneur, philanthropist and educationist
 Raj B. Shetty, Indian actor and film director
 Rakshit Shetty, Indian actor and film director
 Reshma Shetty (born 1977), British-American actress and singer
 Rishab Shetty, Indian actor and film director
 Rohit Shetty, film director
 Salil Shetty (born 1961), Secretary General of Amnesty International
 Sanam Shetty (born 1988), actress
 Sanchita Shetty, actress
 Shamita Shetty (born 1979), interior designer, former actress and model
 Shashi Kiran Shetty (born 1959), former chairman of Allcargo Logistics
 Shilpa Shetty (born 1975), actress
 Shweta Shetty (born 1969), Indian-German based singer
 Srinidhi Shetty, Indian Model & Kannada Film Actress
 Sudarshan Shetty (born 1961), artist
 Suniel Shetty (born 1961), actor, producer and entrepreneur
 V. P. Shetty, Indian banker
 Yagna Shetty, Kannada actress

References

Indian surnames
Karnataka society
Bunt community surnames